Cerithium echinatum is a species of small sea snail, a marine gastropod mollusk in the family Cerithiidae.

Description
This snail's shell has a short siphonal canal. The shell has spiral rows of bumps as well as reddish-brown dashes. It has been found at 53mm in size.

Distribution
The distribution of Cerithium echinatum includes the Indo-Pacific.
It is found off the southern African coast at northern KwaZulu-Natal and Mozambique in 15-30m of water.

References

External links 

 Image from Natural History Museum Rotterdam: 

Cerithiidae
Taxa named by Jean-Baptiste Lamarck
Gastropods described in 1822